Airing in a Closed Carriage is a 1943 British historical novel written by Marjorie Bowen under the pseudonym of Joseph Shearing. Two brothers develop a fierce rivalry over the same woman. It was inspired by the real life murder trial of Florence Maybrick.

Film adaptation
In 1947 the novel was turned into a British film The Mark of Cain directed by Brian Desmond Hurst and starring Eric Portman and Sally Gray. It was one of four adaptations of Bowen's novels made in 1947–48.

References

Bibliography
 Geoff Mayer & Brian McDonnell. Encyclopedia of Film Noir. ABC-CLIO, 2007.

1943 British novels
Novels by Marjorie Bowen
British novels adapted into films
British historical novels
Harper & Brothers books